David Matthew Krmpotich (born April 20, 1955) is an American rower. He won a silver medal at the 1988 Olympic Games in the men's coxless fours, along with Thomas Bohrer, Richard Kennelly, and Raoul Rodriguez.

He was born in Duluth, Minnesota. As of 2015 he has been coaching boys crew for Monsignor Bonner Catholic High School in Upper Darby, Pennsylvania.

References

External links 
 
 
 

1955 births
Living people
Sportspeople from Duluth, Minnesota
Rowers at the 1988 Summer Olympics
Olympic silver medalists for the United States in rowing
American male rowers
World Rowing Championships medalists for the United States
Medalists at the 1988 Summer Olympics
Pan American Games medalists in rowing
Pan American Games silver medalists for the United States
Rowers at the 1991 Pan American Games